West Bretton is a civil parish in the metropolitan borough of the City of Wakefield, West Yorkshire, England.  The parish contains 40 listed buildings that are recorded in the National Heritage List for England.  Of these, four are listed at Grade II*, the middle of the three grades, and the others are at Grade II, the lowest grade.  The parish contains the village of West Bretton and the surrounding area, much of which is occupied by Bretton Park, the grounds of the country house, Bretton Hall.  The hall is listed, together with a number of associated buildings, and structures in the park.  The other listed buildings include houses, cottages and associated structures, farmhouses and farm buildings, a well head and a niche for a water pump, a church and associated structures, a school, a former mill building, a sculpture, and four mileposts.


Key

Buildings

References

Citations

Sources

 

Lists of listed buildings in West Yorkshire